The 1968 NCAA University Division Cross Country Championships were the 30th annual cross country meet to determine the team and individual national champions of men's collegiate cross country running in the United States. Held on November 25, 1968, the meet was hosted by Manhattan College at Van Cortlandt Park in the Bronx, New York City, New York. The distance for this race was 6 miles (9.7 kilometers).

All NCAA University Division members were eligible to qualify for the meet. In total, 24 teams and 217 individual runners contested this championship.

The team national championship was again retained by the Villanova Wildcats, their third title. The individual championship was won by Michael Ryan, from Air Force, with a time of 29:16.8.

Men's title
Distance: 6 miles (9.7 kilometers)

Team Result (Top 10)

See also
NCAA Men's Division II Cross Country Championship

References
 
 

NCAA Cross Country Championships
NCAA University Division Cross Country Championships
NCAA Division I Cross Country Championships
NCAA Division I Cross Country Championships
Manhattan College
Track and field in New York City